Kordestani is a Persian surname. Notable people with the surname include:

Eshrat Kordestani (born 1984), Iranian Paralympian in Sitting volleyball
Hassan Kordestani, Iranian footballer
Omid Kordestani (born 1963), Iranian-Kurdish American businessman

Persian-language surnames
Ethnonymic surnames